Roger Fuller Harrington (born December 24, 1925) is an American electrical engineer and professor emeritus at Syracuse University. He is best known for his contributions to computational electromagnetics with his development of method of moments (MoM). Harrington's 1968 book, Field Computation by Moment Methods, is regarded as a pivotal textbook on the subject.

Biography
Harrington was born on December 24, 1925, in Buffalo, New York. He started majoring in electrical engineering in 1943 at Syracuse University; his studies were interrupted in the following year by World War II. During this time, he served as an instructor under the Electronics Training Program at the U.S. Naval Radio Materiel School in Dearborn, Michigan, while working as an electronics technician. He completed his studies after the war, receiving B.S. and M.S. degrees in 1948 and 1950, respectively. Briefly remaining at Syracuse University as a research assistant and instructor, he started his doctoral studies under Victor H. Rumsey at Ohio State University, receiving his PhD in 1952.

Harrington returned to Syracuse University following his doctoral studies, working there as a professor until his retirement in 1994.  Following his retirement, he briefly worked as a visiting professor at University of Arizona. During his tenure at Syracuse University, he has worked on research projects for the U.S. Army Signal Corps, Office of Naval Research, General Electric and the U.S. Air Force Office of Scientific Research. He has also held visiting professorship positions at University of Illinois in between 1959 and 1960, University of California, Berkeley in 1964 and the Technical University of Denmark in 1969.

Harrington is a recipient of IEEE Centennial Medal, IEEE Antennas and Propagation Society Distinguished Achievement Award and IEEE Electromagnetics Award in 1984, 1989 and 2000, respectively. In 2014, he was awarded the Benjamin Franklin Medal in electrical engineering for his contributions to the study of electromagnetics. He currently resides in Wheaton, Illinois with his daughter.

Research
Harrington has published two standard engineering textbooks, Introduction to Electromagnetic Engineering in 1958 and Time-Harmonic Electromagnetic Fields in 1961. In 1968, he published Field Computation by Moment Methods, which introduced the unified and generalized theory of method of moments (MoM), an integral equation method for solving electromagnetic problems. The development of the method stemmed from Harrington's initial interest in using electromagnetic fields in thermonuclear fusion research. Harrington further developed the method in his future publications; method of moments later became one of go-to methods in the study of antennas, integrated circuits and waveguides, among others. Harrington's further work included the study of radiation and scattering in bodies of revolution, dielectric scattering, field integral equations and theory of characteristic modes.

Harrington also expanded Lan Jen Chu and Harold Alden Wheeler's theory on the fundamental limits of electrically small radio antennas; Chu–Harrington limit, which yields a lower bound for the Q factor of a small radio antenna, is named after him.

Selected publications
Articles

Books

Book chapters

References

Living people
1925 births
Scientists from Buffalo, New York
20th-century American engineers
Electrical engineering academics
Syracuse University College of Engineering and Computer Science alumni
Syracuse University faculty
Ohio State University alumni
Microwave engineers
IEEE Centennial Medal laureates
People from Wheaton, Illinois
United States Navy personnel of World War II
University of Arizona alumni
American electronics engineers
American telecommunications engineers
American engineering writers
20th-century American non-fiction writers
American male non-fiction writers
Fellow Members of the IEEE
20th-century American male writers